Hell Is for Wimps is the second studio album by Christian pop rock band Newsboys. It was released in 1990 by Star Song Records.

Track listing

Music videos
"Simple Man"

Radio singles
"All I Can See"
"In the End"
"Ten Thousand Miles"
"Simple Man"

Personnel 

Newsboys
 Sean Taylor – bass
 John James – lead vocals
 Peter Furler – drums, backing vocals
 Jonathan Geange – guitars

Additional musicians
 Michael Gleason – keyboards, backing vocals 
 Sonny Lallerstedt – acoustic guitar, electric guitar
 George Perdikis – guitars on "Victory"

 Production

 Michael Gleason – producer 
 Dez Dickerson – executive producer 
 Jeff Moseley – executive producer
 Sonny Lallerstedt – recording, mixing
 Denny Purcell – mastering 
 David Perdkis – drum technician
 Toni Thigpen – art direction, design 
 Todd Tufts – illustration

References

Newsboys albums
1990 albums